Mono Band EP is the first release from Mono Band, a side project of Noel Hogan, guitarist of The Cranberries. Their debut EP was released on May 20, 2005 in the Republic of Ireland. It was quickly followed by their debut album, Mono Band.

Track listing
"Waves"
"Run Wild"
"Crazy"
"Why?"
"Brighter Sky"

Band members
Noel Hogan – guitar, programming, backing vocals
Richard Walters – lead vocals (1)
Alexandra Hemnede – lead vocals (2, 4)
Kate Havnevik – lead vocals (3)
Soname Yangchen – lead vocals (5)
Marius De Vries – additional keyboards & programming (5)
Fergal Lawler – drums (1, 2, 3)

References

2005 EPs
Mono Band albums